Square One was a quiz programme that was produced by Granada Television and aired on the ITV network from 1980 until 1984, the original host was Nick Turnbull who hosted the first series then comedian Joe Brown became the host until it ended in 1984.

Transmission guide

References
UK Game Shows - Square One

1980 British television series debuts
1984 British television series endings
1980s British game shows
Television shows produced by Granada Television